Koen Pijpers (born on May 30, 1969 in Maassluis) is a Dutch retired field hockey player who represented the Dutch national team.

References

1969 births
Living people
Dutch male field hockey players
Dutch field hockey coaches
Sportspeople from Maassluis
20th-century Dutch people